Short Cuts was an Australian children's television series that first screened on the Seven Network in 2001. The 26-episode series was aimed at teenagers. It was financed by the Australian Film Finance Corporation and Burberry Productions. The series was subsequently repeated on the youth-oriented network ABC3 in March and April 2011.

Premise
Short Cuts depicts a group of students in a media studies class facing the challenges of growing up and using a camera to express themselves for their schoolwork.

Location
The series was filmed at Fitzroy High School in the inner north of Melbourne.

Cast
 Alex Tsitsopoulos as Ross Papasavas
 Gemma Bishop as Sophie Bennett
 Damien Bodie as Oscar Coxon
 Katie Barnes as Fiona Frischmann
 Alexander Cappelli as Kurt Winters
 Leah De Niese as Ruth Hartnell
 Lucia Smyrk as Anna Klopfer
 Dylan Gray as Tim McQuilten
 Joel Gray as Tom McQuilten
 Matthew Green as Gordon Long
 Kym Osborne as office guy

Recurring roles
Katerina Kotsonis as Mrs Papasavas, Ross's mother
 Marcus Eyre as Aaron Winters, Kurt's father
 Alex Konis as Laz Papasavas, Ross's brother
 Marieke Hardy, writer of the series, guest starred as Josephine Coxon in 2 episodes.

Episodes

One series of Short Cuts was filmed, and comprised 26 episodes.

Season 1 (2001)

Awards

Marieke Hardy won an Australian Writers' Guild Award in 2002 for Short Cuts.

See also 
 List of Australian television series

References

External links
 
 Short Cuts - Burberry Productions
 Short Cuts at the Australian Television Information Archive
Short Cuts - "Wheels on Fire" at Australian Screen Online

Seven Network original programming
Australian children's television series
2002 Australian television series debuts
2003 Australian television series endings
English-language television shows
Television series about teenagers